Ciarán Murtagh (born 1992) is a Gaelic footballer who plays for St Faithleach's and the Roscommon county team.

A son of Andy and Breda Murtagh, he completed a degree in corporate law at NUI Galway before returning to his studies at Marino Institute of Education to become a teacher. While at Galway he played in the university's Sigerson Cup team.

He made his senior championship debut against Leitrim in the 2014 Connacht Senior Football Championship quarter-final. He scored a late goal against Down in the 2014 All-Ireland Senior Football Championship.

He has captained Roscommon.

Murtagh has also played for Donegal Boston.

References

1990s births
Living people
Year of birth uncertain
Alumni of the University of Galway
Donegal Boston Gaelic footballers
Irish expatriate sportspeople in the United States
University of Galway Gaelic footballers
Roscommon inter-county Gaelic footballers
St Faithleachs Gaelic footballers